Hangin' Out is the third studio album by Funk, Inc., released in 1973.

Track listing

Personnel
Gene Barr - Tenor saxophone
Cecil Hunt - Conga
Jimmy Munford - Drums, Vocals
Bobby Watley - Organ, Vocals
Steve Weakley - Guitar

Charts

External links
 Hangin' Out at Discogs

1973 albums
Funk, Inc. albums
Prestige Records albums
Albums recorded at Van Gelder Studio